José Bonifácio may refer to:

People
 José Bonifácio de Andrada e Silva (1763–1838), Brazilian poet, statesman and politician
 José Bonifácio the Younger (1827–1886), Brazilian poet and senator
 José Bonifácio Lafayette de Andrada (1904–1986), Brazilian politician and former president of the Chamber of Deputies of Brazil

Locations
 José Bonifácio, São Paulo, a city in São Paulo
 José Bonifácio (district), a district of São Paulo

Other uses
 José Bonifácio Esporte Clube, a football club

Bonifacio, Jose